Richard A. Cosier (born May 18, 1947 in Jackson, Michigan) is an American academic. He is Leeds Professor of Management and Co-Director, Burton D. Morgan Center for Entrepreneurship.  He was the Dean of the Krannert School of Management at Purdue University from August 1, 1999 to June 30, 2010.  In the 1990s Cosier was dean of the Michael F. Price College of Business at the University of Oklahoma. He was the 2008-2009 chair of the Association to Advance Collegiate Schools of Business in Tampa, Florida. 

He received his Bachelor of Arts degree from the School of Packaging at Michigan State University in 1969, his Master of Business Administration from Loyola University Chicago in 1972 and his Ph.D. from the University of Iowa in 1975.  

Cosier serves on the Board of Directors of Kite Realty Group in Indianapolis, Indiana and Roll Coater Inc., also based in Indianapolis.  He has served on the Board of Directors for First Fidelity Bank, N.A. of Oklahoma City, Oklahoma, Century, Inc. of Midwest City, Oklahoma, and Bank One of Lafayette, Indiana.

Cosier stepped down as dean of Krannert effective June 30, 2010.  He will retain his position as Leeds Professor of Management and became the Avrum and Joyce Gray Director of the Burton D. Morgan Center for Entrepreneurship at Purdue beginning January 1, 2011 following a six-month sabbatical in the fall of 2010.

References

External links
  Krannert Graduate School of Management -  Office of the Dean
 The Association to Advance Collegiate Schools of Business
  Kite Realty Group
Purdue University Discovery Park Home Page

1947 births
Krannert School of Management faculty
University of Oklahoma faculty
Michigan State University alumni
Loyola University Chicago alumni
University of Iowa alumni
Living people